Albert Henry Clay (7 May 1915 – 30 April 1972) was an Australian rules footballer who played for Fitzroy in the Victorian Football League (VFL). His twin brother Ivor also played with him in the Fitzroy side.

In 1939, Bert and his identical twin brother, Ivor trained with North Melbourne under coach, Keith Forbes, but both missed out on the being selected in the final list and returned to Henty, NSW.

Originally from the Hunter Football Club in the Lockington Football Association, Bert was recruited from Henty, where he played in their 1937 premiership and was runner up in the 1938 Albury & District Football League's best and fairest award (lost on a count back) then won the 1939 award. Clay played in Henty's losing 1939 grand final side against Brocklesby.

Clay played as a ruckman and was instrumental in the club's 1944 Grand Final victory, rated by his opponent Jack Dyer as the best on ground.

Clay retired from VFL football at 36 years of age, after 152 games.

References

External links

1937 - Albury & DFL Premiers: Henty FC team photo
1939 - Albury & DFL Best & Fairest, Albert Clay photo
1950 - football photo of brothers, Bert & Ivor Clay 

1915 births
1972 deaths
Australian rules footballers from Bendigo
Australian Rules footballers: place kick exponents
Fitzroy Football Club players
Fitzroy Football Club Premiership players
Australian twins
Twin sportspeople
One-time VFL/AFL Premiership players